Ahmed Ahahaoui (born 6 December 1983) is a Dutch professional footballer who currently plays for ASV De Dijk in the Derde Divisie.

Club career
Born in Amsterdam to Moroccan parents, he formerly played for Haarlem and Go Ahead Eagles, before joining VVV-Venlo in 2009. In 2010, he announced he was leaving them and wanted to find a club abroad. He ended up at FC Volendam, before moving to Topklasse outfit IJsselmeervogels.

In summer 2015, Ahahaoui joined Dutch Hoofdklasser VV De Meern, only to leave for De Dijk in summer 2016.

References

External links
 Ex-Spartaan Achmed Ahahaoui grijpt laatste kans (Bio early years) - Algemeen Dagblad 

1983 births
Living people
Footballers from Amsterdam
Dutch sportspeople of Moroccan descent
Dutch footballers
HFC Haarlem players
Go Ahead Eagles players
VVV-Venlo players
FC Volendam players
IJsselmeervogels players
Eredivisie players
Eerste Divisie players
Derde Divisie players
ASV De Dijk players
Association football wingers